Hyattstown is an unincorporated community in Montgomery County, Maryland, United States.

Established in 1798 by founder Jesse Hyatt, Hyattstown is located on Maryland Route 355 in upper Montgomery County. In this full-service town, there was the Hyattstown Inn, a one-room school-house, a butcher, a blacksmith, and other commercial venues. These historical commercial buildings are now private homes.

Quarries nearby supplied slate for roofing the old United States Capitol in Washington, D.C.

Hyattstown was the location of a Civil War artillery battle between General Nathaniel Prentice Banks' troops and General Stonewall Jackson's troops in 1862.

Hyattstown Christian Church, a Disciples of Christ congregation that was established in 1840, continues worship, service, and outreach activities into the present day.

The town is also close to Frederick County, Maryland, up where it borders Urbana.

References

Unincorporated communities in Montgomery County, Maryland
Unincorporated communities in Maryland